Yamadera Nobuaki (?-?) was a Japanese samurai of the Sengoku period, who served the Takeda clan.

Samurai
Takeda retainers
Year of birth missing
Year of death missing